Odeon Film is a film production company based in Munich, Germany.

Since 12 April 1999 Odeon Film AG is listed at the stock exchange. It is member of the CDAX.

Subsidiaries
The subsidiary Monaco Film mostly produces crime series.

Films

TV series

Still running 
 Ein Fall für zwei (since 1981)
 Der Landarzt (since 1987, novafilm)
 Der Kriminalist (since 2006, Monaco Film)
 Der Staatsanwalt (since 2007)
 Die Stein (since  2008)
 Letzte Spur Berlin (since 2012, novafilm)
 Familie Undercover (since 2012)

Former 
 Liebling Kreuzberg (novafilm)
 Unser Lehrer Doktor Specht (novafilm)
 Der letzte Zeuge (novafilm)
 KDD – Kriminaldauerdienst
 Türkisch für Anfänger

External links
 

Companies based in Munich
Film production companies of Germany